The Bylot Island Migratory Bird Sanctuary is a migratory bird sanctuary in Qikiqtaaluk, Nunavut, Canada.  Located on Bylot Island, it was federally designated in 1965, and is classified as Category IV by the International Union for Conservation of Nature. It was created to protect the nesting grounds of thick-billed murre, black-legged kittiwake and greater snow goose.

At 1,282,731 hectares, it is Nunavut's second largest MBS after the Queen Maud Gulf Migratory Bird Sanctuary. Of its overall size,  is a marine area, with marine, intertidal, and subtidal components.

Other designations
The sanctuary is a part of three Canadian Important Bird Areas: Cape Graham Moore, Cape Hay, and Southwest Bylot. Part of it is also included in the Sirmilik National Park.

References

External links
 Vegetation Dynamics field study in Bylot Island Bird Sanctuary

Bird sanctuaries of Qikiqtaaluk Region
Important Bird Areas of Qikiqtaaluk Region
Migratory Bird Sanctuaries of Canada
Important Bird Areas of Arctic islands
Seabird colonies